In economics, convex preferences are an individual's ordering of various outcomes, typically with regard to the amounts of various goods consumed, with the property that, roughly speaking, "averages are better than the extremes". The concept roughly corresponds to the concept of diminishing marginal utility without requiring utility functions.

Notation 

Similarly,  can be translated as 'is strictly better than' (in preference satisfaction), and Similarly,  can be translated as 'is equivalent to' (in preference satisfaction).

Definition 
Use x, y, and z to denote three consumption bundles (combinations of various quantities of various goods).  Formally, a preference relation  on the consumption set X is called convex if whenever 

then for every :
.
i.e., for any two bundles that are each viewed as being at least as good as a third bundle, a weighted average of the two bundles is viewed as being at least as good as the third bundle.

A preference relation  is called strictly convex if whenever

then for every :

i.e., for any two distinct bundles that are each viewed as being at least as good as a third bundle, a weighted average of the two bundles (including a positive amount of each bundle) is viewed as being strictly better than the third bundle.

Alternative definition 
Use x and y to denote two consumption bundles. A preference relation  is called convex if for any 
 where 

then for every :
.

That is, if a bundle y is preferred over a bundle x, then any mix of y with x is still preferred over x.

A preference relation is called strictly convex if whenever

then for every :
.
.

That is, for any two bundles that are viewed as being equivalent, a weighted average of the two bundles is better than each of these bundles.

Examples 
1. If there is only a single commodity type, then any weakly-monotonically-increasing preference relation is  convex. This is because, if , then every weighted average of y and ס is also .

2. Consider an economy with two commodity types, 1 and 2. Consider a preference relation represented by the following Leontief utility function:

This preference relation is convex. : suppose x and y are two equivalent bundles, i.e. . If the minimum-quantity commodity in both bundles is the same (e.g. commodity 1), then this implies . If the minimum commodity in each bundle is different (e.g.  but ), then this implies . This preference relation is convex, but not strictly-convex.

3. A preference relation represented by linear utility functions is convex, but not strictly convex.

4. Consider a preference relation represented by:
 
Then  since both have utility 5. However, the convex combination  is worse than both of them since its utility is 4.

Relation to indifference curves and utility functions 
A set of convex-shaped indifference curves displays convex preferences: Given a convex indifference curve containing the set of all bundles (of two or more goods) that are all viewed as equally desired, the set of all goods bundles that are viewed as being at least as desired as those on the indifference curve is a convex set.

Convex preferences with their associated convex indifference mapping arise from quasi-concave utility functions, although these are not necessary for the analysis of preferences. For example, Constant Elasticity of Substitution (CES) utility functions describe convex, homothetic preferences. CES preferences are self-dual and both primal and dual CES preferences yield systems of indifference curves that may exhibit any degree of convexity.

See also 
 Convex function
 Level set
 Quasi-convex function
 Semi-continuous function
 Shapley–Folkman lemma

References

Economics curves
Utility function types